Indirect parliamentary elections were held in Cuba on 27 November 1986.

On 19 and 26 October voters elected members of the 169 Municipal Assemblies. A total of 6,704,479 votes were cast in the first round (19 October), a turnout of 97.65%. In the second round (26 October) turnout was 93.4%. The elected members of the Municipal Assemblies then elected the 510 members of the National Assembly.

References

Cuba
Parliamentary elections in Cuba
Local elections in Cuba
1986 in Cuba
One-party elections
November 1986 events in North America
Election and referendum articles with incomplete results